Ascanio Giacobazio or Ascanio Giacovazzi (died 12 April 1612) was a Roman Catholic prelate who served as Bishop of Anglona-Tursi (1595–1612).

Biography
On 10 April 1595, Ascanio Giacobazio was appointed Bishop of Anglona-Tursi by Pope Clement VIII. On 1 May 1595, he was consecrated bishop by Alessandro Ottaviano de' Medici, Archbishop of Florence, with Ludovico de Torres, Archbishop of Monreale, and Leonard Abel, Titular Bishop of Sidon, serving as co-consecrators. He served as Bishop of Anglona-Tursi until his resignation in 1609. He died on 12 April 1612.

References

External links and additional sources
 (for Chronology of Bishops) 
 (for Chronology of Bishops) 

16th-century Italian Roman Catholic bishops
17th-century Italian Roman Catholic bishops
Bishops appointed by Pope Clement VIII
1609 deaths